The Backpacker Chef is a South Korean variety program featuring Baek Jong-won, Oh Dae-hwan, Ahn Bo-hyun and DinDin. It aired every Thursday at 20:40 (KST) on tvN from May 26 till October 6, 2022 for 20 episodes.

Overview
The Backpacker Chef is a cooking entertainment program that challenges the extreme mission of improvising a customized food within a limited time in an unfamiliar place to the customer. Cast members leave with only one backpack containing a variety of kitchen tools and ingredients, and present instant catering for unfamiliar guests at the venue of the day.

In the first season, Backpacker Chefs went on 18 different business trips and cooked for 3078 people, preparing more than 100 different dishes.

Cast

 Baek Jong-won
 Oh Dae-hwan
 Ahn Bo-hyun
 DinDin

Episodes

Viewership

Notes

References

External links
  
 The Backpacker Chef at Naver 
 The Backpacker Chef at Daum 

TVN (South Korean TV channel) original programming
2022 South Korean television series debuts
2022 South Korean television series endings
Korean-language television shows
South Korean television shows
South Korean travel television series
South Korean variety television shows
South Korean cooking television series
South Korean reality television series